Vikedal Church is a parish church of the Church of Norway in Vindafjord Municipality in Rogaland county, Norway. It is located in the village of Vikedal. It is the church for the Vikedal parish which is part of the Haugaland prosti (deanery) in the Diocese of Stavanger. The white, wooden church was built in a long church style in 1881 using designs by the architect Jacob Wilhelm Nordan. The church seats about 400 people.

History

The earliest existing historical records of the church date back to the year 1311, but the church was likely built in the 12th century. During the 1620s, the church underwent a major renovation and then in 1670, the congregation decided to demolish the old church and build a new one on the same site.

In 1814, this church served as an election church. Together with more than 300 other parish churches across Norway, it was a polling station for elections to the 1814 Norwegian Constituent Assembly which wrote the Constitution of Norway. This was Norway's first national elections. Each church parish was a constituency that elected people called "electors" who later met together in each county to elect the representatives for the assembly that was to meet in Eidsvoll later that year.

In the late 1820s and again in 1834, the church was repaired after being struck by lightning and heavily damaged. After the new church was consecrated and in use, the old church was closed and in 1883, the old church was torn down. The cemetery surrounding the old church continued to be used for a time after the church was torn down, but eventually the cemetery was closed as well.

See also
List of churches in Rogaland

References

Vindafjord
Churches in Rogaland
Wooden churches in Norway
19th-century Church of Norway church buildings
Churches completed in 1881
12th-century establishments in Norway
Norwegian election church